Manninagh KateDhu, commonly known as Peta (1963/64 – early 1980), was the Chief Mouser to the Cabinet Office of the United Kingdom government between 1964 and , and was the first female cat in that role. She became the replacement of Peter III, who had died at the age of 16 in 1964.

After Peter III's death, the Lieutenant Governor of the Isle of Man, Sir Ronald Garvey, suggested that a Manx cat be his replacement, and sent Peta to the Cabinet. She was noted to be lazy and loud, and not toilet trained. By 1969, some civil servants had tried to remove her from Cabinet, but this did not happen, because of the suspected bad publicity that this action would incur. She was not heard of again, until a reply to a member of the public in 1976 revealed that she had retired to the home of a civil servant. Her successor was Wilberforce, who became the next Chief Mouser in the 1970s.

See also
 List of individual cats

References

1960s animal births
1980 animal deaths
Cats in the Isle of Man
Individual cats in the United Kingdom
Individual cats in England
Individual cats in politics
Working cats
Chief Mousers to the Cabinet Office